Vagabond is a 1950 Iranian film directed by Mehdi Reisfirooz.

Cast
 Mehr-Aghdas Khajenuri 
 Naser Malek Motiee
 Soosan

References

Bibliography 
 Mohammad Ali Issari. Cinema in Iran, 1900-1979. Scarecrow Press, 1989.

External links 
 

1950 films
1950s Persian-language films
Films directed by Mehdi Reisfirooz
Iranian black-and-white films
Iranian drama films
1950 drama films